The Troy Jail is a historic jail building listed on the National Register of Historic Places in Troy, Montana.  It was added to the Register on December 27, 2006.

It was built in 1924 by local builder D.E Crissey for $1,760.00.

References

Jails on the National Register of Historic Places in Montana
National Register of Historic Places in Lincoln County, Montana
Early Commercial architecture in the United States
Government buildings completed in 1924
1924 establishments in Montana